The Cardinal Heenan Catholic High School is a comprehensive school and sixth form for boys located in West Derby, Liverpool, L12 9HZ, England.

History
The school is named after Cardinal John Carmel Heenan. Until 1983 it was known as Cardinal Allen Grammar School, when it merged with St Margaret Mary's Boys' School. It opened in September 1958 with around 300 boys when administered by the Liverpool Education Committee. Next door was the Convent of Mercy (R.C. Girls) High School, a girls' grammar school on Yew Tree Lane.

The school was originally based at two sites, one for Year 7 and 8 (years 1 and 2 of the old school year system) around half a mile (800m) from the main building on Pilch Lane, Huyton. The upper school, now the only building, is based at Honeysgreen Lane, West Derby.

Notable former pupils
 Mike Di Scala (music producer)
 Sean Doherty (footballer)
 Steven Gerrard (Liverpool/England footballer).
 Jay McEveley (Derby/Scotland footballer)
 David Nugent (Portsmouth/England footballer).
 Bradley Orr (Blackburn Rovers footballer)
 David Price (boxer)
 Carl Tremarco (Wrexham footballer)
 John Welsh (Hull City FC/England under-21 footballer)
 David Price (US Footballer and Manager)
 Tyias Browning (Everton Footballer)
 Joey Molland (member of Badfinger)
 Ian Hart (actor)
 Adam Rowe (Comedian & Podcaster)
 Callum Wright (footballer)

Cardinal Allen R.C. Grammar School
 Ian Hart (real name Ian Davies – actor)
 Colin Harvey (footballer 1960s & 70s for England, Everton F.C. and Sheffield Wednesday F.C.)
 Paul McGann (actor)

References

External links 
 
 CardinalHeenanPTA.org.uk Cardinal Heenan PTA website
 EduBase

News items
 Boy suspended for selling unhealthy crisps in December 2009
 Teacher Brendan Beech resigns after pupil sex allegation, liverpoolecho.co.uk, 28 September 2010.

Catholic secondary schools in the Archdiocese of Liverpool
Boys' schools in Merseyside
Secondary schools in Liverpool
Educational institutions established in 1958
1958 establishments in England
Voluntary aided schools in England